Ragam, or raga, is a melodic framework for musical improvisation.

Ragam may also refer to:

 Ragam (surname), including a list of people with the name
 Ragam (festival), an annual cultural festival hosted by the National Institute of Technology Calicut

See also